Audrey Dwyer is a Canadian writer, actor, and director. She is a former associate artistic director of the Royal Manitoba Theatre Centre. She wrote the 2018 comedy, Calpurnia.

Early life 

Dwyer was born in Winnipeg, Manitoba. She studied theatre at the University of Manitoba.

Career 

In 2011, Dwyer did dramaturgy for and directed Rabiayshna Productions' The Apology. From 2016 to 2017, Dwyer was the artistic director of Cow Over Moon Children’s Theatre in Mississauga. She also served as the associate artistic director of both Tarragon Theatre and Nightwood Theatre in Toronto.

Dwyer's play, Calpurnia, premiered in 2018 in Toronto with Nightwood Theatre and Sulong Theatre, under Dwyer's direction. Calpurnia follows a young Jamaican-Canadian writer who is writing a script retelling To Kill A Mockingbird from the perspective of one of the book's minor characters, Calpurnia. The play tackles themes of race, class, and privilege. fu-GEN Theatre selected Calpurnia as one of their top 49 groundbreaking plays by women of colour. Also in 2018, Dwyer developed and performed in One Thing Leads to Another for Young People's Theatre.

In 2019, Dwyer was appointed associate artistic director of the Royal Manitoba Theatre Centre. She previously acted in the RMTC's 2015 production of Vanya and Sonia and Masha and Spike. In 2020, she directed the RMTC's premiere of Frances Koncan's Women of the Fur Trade. The next year, she directed The Mountaintop with RMTC. The production was streamed online to accommodate COVID-19 restrictions. The RMTC is set to put on Dwyer's play Calpurnia in 2022.

Dwyer wrote the 6-episode Crave series, The D Cut, which premiered in 2020. In 2020, Dwyer wrote the libretto for the opera Backstage at Carnegie Hall. Backstage was composed by Tim Brady and was based on Charlie Christian's 1939 Carnegie Hall performance with Benny Goodman's band.

Dwyer's audio-play, Come Home – The Legend Of Daddy Hall, premiered in May 2021 with Tarragon Theatre. Dwyer directed the production which featured the voices of Jesse Clark, Beau Dixon, Starr Domingue, and Jackie Richardson.

Acting credits

Television

Theatre

Directing credits

Theatre

Awards

References

External links 

 

Living people
Canadian artistic directors
21st-century Canadian dramatists and playwrights
Canadian women dramatists and playwrights
Canadian stage actresses
21st-century Canadian actresses
Canadian television actresses
Date of birth missing (living people)
University of Manitoba alumni
Canadian television writers
Year of birth missing (living people)
Canadian women television writers